Henry Drummond (1762–1794), of The Grange, near Alresford, Hampshire, was an English banker and politician who sat in the House of Commons from 1790 to 1794.

Drummond was the son of Hon. Henry Drummond, banker of Charing Cross, Westminster and The Grange and his wife Elizabeth Compton, daughter of Hon. Charles Compton and was born on 13 January 1762. He was educated at Harrow School from 1774 to 1779. He married Anne Dundas, daughter of Henry Dundas on 13 February 1786.

Drummond was made a partner in the family bank in 1787. In the 1790 general election he was returned without opposition as Member (MP) of the Parliament of Great Britain for Castle Rising. He suffered from an unexplained disease and died after a ‘gradual decline’ on 4 July 1794. his son Henry was also a banker and MP.

References

1762 births
1794 deaths
British MPs 1790–1796
People educated at Harrow School
Members of the Parliament of Great Britain for English constituencies
People from Alresford